The Federação de Futebol do Acre  (English: Football Association of Acre) was founded on 21 January 1947, and it manages all the official football tournaments within the state of Acre, which are the Campeonato Acriano and the Campeonato Acriano lower levels, and represents the clubs at the Brazilian Football Confederation (CBF).

References

Acre
Football in Acre (state)
Sports organizations established in 1947